Hagan Evans (birth unknown) is a Welsh former rugby union, and professional rugby league footballer who played in the 1940s.

Playing career

International honours
Hagan Evans won 2 caps for Wales (RL) in 1947–1949 while at Bradford Northern and Hull.

Challenge Cup Final appearances
Hagan Evans played  in Bradford Northern's 8–4 victory over Leeds in the 1947 Challenge Cup Final during the 1946-47 season at Wembley Stadium, London on Saturday 3 May 1947.

Family
Hagan Evans' brother, Peter Evans, captained Llanelli RFC, and was capped twice by Wales (RU) in 1951 against England, and France

References

External links

Bradford Bulls players
Footballers who switched code
Hull F.C. players
Llanelli RFC players
Place of birth missing
Possibly living people
Rugby league locks
Rugby league players from Llanelli
Rugby union players from Llanelli
Wales national rugby league team players
Welsh rugby league players
Welsh rugby union players
Year of birth missing